The Medical Faculties, Osh State University are a public medical institute located in Osh, Kyrgyzstan. It opened in 1993 as of the reorganisation of the Osh State Pedagogical Institute into Osh State University.

The Medical Faculties are International Medical Faculty OshSU, Medical Faculty OshSU, Postgraduate Medical Education Faculty OshSU and prepare medical professionals in specialties of General medicine, Dentistry, pediatrics and residency in various specialities in Medicine and Surgery. 

Osh state University medical faculty is recognised by the WHO,NMC,PMC,World directory of medical schools etc.. 

Every year hundreds of international students are graduated from international medical faculty.Many of them pursue their desired career in many countries like USA,UK,CANADA,INDIA,RUSSIA and many parts of Europe. 

Many Indians and Pakistani students after their graduation successfully clear the license examination in india and pakistan and being practised in their countries 

Faculty staff, Scientific research activities 

The International Medical Faculty of Osh State University is the higher educational establishment in the south of Kyrgyzstan. More than 2202 foreign students study at the faculty and 151-teaching staff works at the 6 departments of IMF. 10 Doctors of Medical Science, 29 Candidates of Sciences, 2 PhD, 2 Honored Doctors, 11 senior teachers, 91 teachers and more than 30 Excellent Workers of Public Health and Education are successfully working at the faculty. Teachers of IMF actively participate in international conferences and workshops, also they organize students` research club. Main directions of scientific work at the International Medical Faculty: • Histology and Embryology: morphological features of placenta in women with full-term pregnancy considering age, constitutional causes and ethnic factors. • Pathophysiology: investigation of morphofunctional features of the mucous membranes of the upper respiratory tract. • Biochemistry and chemistry: the development of drugs based on natural compounds and the synthesis of active substances (HIV, cancer cells, tuberculosis). • Rheumatology: clinical and immunological features of pulmonary disease in rheumatoid arthritis • Pediatrics: clinical and functional characteristics of non-rheumatic heart damage in children in the southern region of the republic. • Surgery: modern possibilities of combined low invasive correction of the bile duct. Surgical tactics with hemorrhoids complicated by anemia. • Gynecology: Superficial activity of amniotic fluid and placental microstructures in low mountain, mid-mountain and high mountain areas of Kyrgyzstan. • Pharmacology: pharmacoepidemiology of drugs for community-acquired pneumonia in the elderly in the KR. • Challenges of global civilization: social and humanitarian aspects.

Academic meetings and international conferences are held every year,students and professors interact with other international universities.Osh state University emerging as the ambitious university by their excellence of improvement   

Faculty staff, Scientific research activities 

The International Medical Faculty of Osh State University is the higher educational establishment in the south of Kyrgyzstan. More than 2202 foreign students study at the faculty and 151-teaching staff works at the 6 departments of IMF. 10 Doctors of Medical Science, 29 Candidates of Sciences, 2 PhD, 2 Honored Doctors, 11 senior teachers, 91 teachers and more than 30 Excellent Workers of Public Health and Education are successfully working at the faculty. Teachers of IMF actively participate in international conferences and workshops, also they organize students` research club. Main directions of scientific work at the International Medical Faculty: • Histology and Embryology: morphological features of placenta in women with full-term pregnancy considering age, constitutional causes and ethnic factors. • Pathophysiology: investigation of morphofunctional features of the mucous membranes of the upper respiratory tract. • Biochemistry and chemistry: the development of drugs based on natural compounds and the synthesis of active substances (HIV, cancer cells, tuberculosis). • Rheumatology: clinical and immunological features of pulmonary disease in rheumatoid arthritis • Pediatrics: clinical and functional characteristics of non-rheumatic heart damage in children in the southern region of the republic. • Surgery: modern possibilities of combined low invasive correction of the bile duct. Surgical tactics with hemorrhoids complicated by anemia. • Gynecology: Superficial activity of amniotic fluid and placental microstructures in low mountain, mid-mountain and high mountain areas of Kyrgyzstan. • Pharmacology: pharmacoepidemiology of drugs for community-acquired pneumonia in the elderly in the KR. • Challenges of global civilization: social and humanitarian aspects.      

 

Medical education in Kyrgyzstan
1992 establishments in Kyrgyzstan
Educational institutions established in 1992